The 2017 Mountain West Conference baseball tournament took place from May 24 through 28 at Santa Ana Star Field in Albuquerque, New Mexico, home field of the conference's regular-season champion New Mexico. The conference's top four teams from the regular season met in a double-elimination tournament. The winner of the tournament, San Diego State, earned the Mountain West Conference's automatic bid to the 2017 NCAA Division I baseball tournament.

Format and seeding
The conference's top four teams were seeded based on winning percentage during the round-robin regular season schedule. The tournament opened with the top seed playing the lowest seeded team, and the second-seeded team playing the third seed, followed by double-elimination play until the champion was determined.

Bracket

References

Tournament
Mountain West Conference baseball tournament
Mountain West Conference baseball tournament
Mountain West Conference baseball tournament